Kendrew is a small settlement in Dr Beyers Naudé Local Municipality in the Eastern Cape province of South Africa.

References

Populated places in the Dr Beyers Naudé Local Municipality